Viasat Sport East is a television channel available in Russia and the CIS countries. The channel heavily features American sports such as the National Hockey League and Major League Baseball.

The channel launched in Russia, Belarus, Moldova, Georgia, Kazakhstan and the Baltic states in November 2006 in cooperation with ESPN America. It was the eighth channel launched by Viasat in Eastern Europe. It later became available in Ukraine, Armenia, Kyrgyzstan and Uzbekistan.

In January 2010, the channel was removed from Viasat's Baltic platform, where it was replaced by Viasat Hockey.

Viasat Sport is stop broadcasting on 6 September 2022 and removed from Viasat packages, however Russian version still working, because license is active.

References

External links
Official site

Modern Times Group
Television channels in Russia
Television channels and stations established in 2006
Sports television networks in Russia